Gender wars may refer to:
Conflict between the anti-gender movement and its opponents
Conflict between different feminist views on transgender topics
Gender Wars, a video game
The Gender War, a documentary about feminism in Sweden
War of the Genders, a Hong Kong TV sitcom

See also
Culture war